Favourite Spanish Dishes  is an EP by the Lemonheads. It was released in the UK in June 1990 and in the United States in February 1991 with two extra tracks - "Step by Step", a cover of the song first released by New Kids on the Block, and a cover of the Misfits' track "Skulls".

Track listing

UK version
All songs by Evan Dando unless otherwise stated.

 "Different Drum" (Michael Nesmith) – 2:50
 "Paint" – 2:49
 "Ride with Me (Acoustic)" – 3:55

US version
All songs by Evan Dando unless otherwise stated.

 "Different Drum" (Michael Nesmith) – 2:50
 "Paint" – 2:49
 "Ride with Me" (Acoustic) – 3:55
 "Step by Step" (Maurice Starr) – 4:08
 "Skulls" (Glenn Danzig) – 2:17

Personnel 
The Lemonheads
Evan Dando – guitar, vocals
Jesse Peretz – bass
David Ryan – drums
Technical
Paul Q. Kolderie – producer
Lou Giordano - engineer

References

The Lemonheads albums
1990 EPs
1991 EPs
Albums produced by Paul Q. Kolderie